Uspenka is an urban-type settlement in Luhansk Raion, a part of Luhansk Oblast within Ukraine. It is located in the eastern part of the greater Donbas region. Population: , .

The village was founded as Vilkhova (lit. Alder) in 1755, after a colonel received a grant of land from the Tsar of Russia. The name "Uspenka" became established in the seventy years after the founding of the village. The town has a long history of coal mining, with the first mine established in 1802. The population of the village has greatly declined with the mining and coke industries: in 1966, there were 18,800 residents; in 2001, only 9676. There is still a coke works in the village that employs some residents, but many commute to Lutuhyne for work. Since 2014, Uspenka has been controlled by forces of the Luhansk People's Republic.

Gallery

References

Notes

Sources
Encyclopedia of Ukraine. Volume 10. / Ed. Vladimir Kubiyovych — Paris; New York: Молоде життя, 1954—1989.
Wysocki, Victor I. Historical aspects of toponymy in Luhansk — Luhansk, 2003 — pp. 196

Urban-type settlements in Luhansk Raion
Yekaterinoslav Governorate